Carlos Barahona Angulo (born January 20, 1980) is a Colombian goalkeeper. He currently plays for San José in the Liga de Fútbol Profesional Boliviano.

He was a member of the Colombian U-19 and U-21 National Teams. He is the older brother of Julián Barahona who plays midfield for Patriotas FC.

1980 births
Living people
Sportspeople from Valle del Cauca Department
Colombian footballers
Cortuluá footballers
Deportivo Pasto footballers
Atlético Nacional footballers
Envigado F.C. players
Cúcuta Deportivo footballers
Club San José players
Categoría Primera A players
Bolivian Primera División players
Colombian expatriate footballers
Expatriate footballers in Bolivia
Association football goalkeepers